The year 1814 in archaeology involved some significant events.

Explorations
 Stamford Raffles becomes the first European to explore Borobudur in Central Java.

Excavations
 Colosseum, Rome: The arena substructure is partly excavated during 1810-1814.

Finds
 Kritonios Crown is found in Armento, Italy.

Publications

Births
 23 January: Alexander Cunningham, father of the Archaeological Survey of India (d. 1893)
 2 September: Ernst Curtius, conducted archaeological research in the late 19th century; primarily interested in Greek archaeology (d. 1896)

Deaths

References

See also
 Roman Forum - excavations.

Archaeology
Archaeology by year
Archaeology
Archaeology